Adelaide Peak is an unofficially named mountain peak in the southern part of the Temescal Mountains. It is composed of Cretaceous granitic rocks of the Peninsular Ranges Batholith.

Adelaide Peak is drained on its southern slopes by an officially unnamed tributary arroyo of Murrieta Creek, tributary of the Santa Margarita River.  It is drained on its northern slopes by an officially unnamed tributary arroyo of Salt Creek, itself a tributary of the San Jacinto River.

References 

Mountains of Riverside County, California
Temescal Mountains
Mountains of Southern California